Mi is the ancient ancestral surname , most notably the name of the imperial house of State of Chu during the Warring States period.

Mǐ
The Mǐ were the royal house of the states of Chu and Kui (夔) during the later Zhou dynasty. They claimed descent from Zhuanxu via his grandson Jilian, whom they credited with founding their dynasty. The Chu Lexicon at the University of Massachusetts conjectures that it was a native Chu word whose meaning was "bear", explaining the cadet members of the family recorded with the surname Xiong (Chinese: "bear").

Chu had a long history of dividing its royal family into numerous cadet branches. Two of the earliest branches of Mi were Dou (鬬) and Cheng (成), together they were known as the Ruo'ao clan. Jing clan (景), Zhao clan (昭), and Qu (屈) clan were later formed by descendants of different Chu kings. Sanlü (三閭) was the unified clan name for Jings, Zhaos and Qus. Minor branches include Ye (葉, originally Shenyin 沈尹), Xiang (項), Lan (蘭), Zha (查) among others.

Some of the Pans of China come from a cadet branch of the family, descended from Pan Chong of the Chu line.

Notable people with the surname

Mi (羋) 
Kings of Chu
Mi Bazi (羋八子, the Queen of Qin's King Huiwen.)
Qu Yuan (屈原, clan name Qu, author of Chu Ci)
Xiang Yu (項羽, clan name Xiang, Chinese historical hero who was famous for his rivalry with Liu Bang)
Duke of Ye (Prime minister of Chu during the late Spring and Autumn period. Clan name Ye, the first Ye.)
Ban Gu, Ban Chao and Ban Jieyu (three siblings from Ruo'ao clan)

Mi (米) 
59th on the "Hundred Family Surnames". It is considered one of the "Nine Sogdian Surnames."
 Mi Fu (Chinese: 米芾 or 米黻; pinyin: Mǐ Fú, also given as Mi Fei, 1051–1107) was a Chinese painter, poet, and calligrapher born in Taiyuan during the Song dynasty

Mi (禰) 
Mi Heng (禰衡; 173 – 200) – Scholar in the Late Han Dynasty

Mi (糜) 
Mi Zhu (糜竺; died c. 221) – Official under warlord Liu Bei in the Late Han Dynasty
Mi Fang (糜芳) General under Liu Bei then military general of Eastern Wu
Lady Mi (麋夫人), wife of warlord Liu Bei

See also
 Hundred Family Surnames

References

Chinese-language surnames
Multiple Chinese surnames

Eight surnames of Zhurong